The Texas Military Department (TMD) is an executive branch agency of the Texas government. Along with the Texas Department of Public Safety, it is charged with providing the security of Texas, which has the second largest population, border, and economy in the United States. It also provides administration of the Texas Military Forces (TXMF), the principle instrument through which it executes security policy. TXMF currently include the Texas Army National Guard, Texas Air National Guard, and Texas State Guard. It formerly included the Texas Rangers, Texas Army, Texas Navy, and Texas Marines.

The Texas Military Department also maintains a variety of civic engagement initiatives to support public relations, accountability, transparency, and safety awareness. It hosts an annual Open House and Toy Drive. It also hosts the Texas ChalleNGe Academy, Texas STARBASE, and Texas Military Forces Museum. It also publishes The Dispatch magazine, TMDTV, smartphone applications, and social media channels.

The Texas Military Department is commanded by the Adjutant General of Texas, who is appointed by and reports to the Governor of Texas. Headquartered at Building Eight in Camp Mabry, TMD's stated mission is to "provide the Governor and President with ready forces in support of state and federal authorities at home and abroad." It is empowered by Article 4, Section 7 of the Texas Constitution to "execute the laws of the State, to suppress insurrections, and to repel invasions."

History 

The Texas Military Department was established as the War Department of the Republic of Texas on August 5, 1836. It was empowered by Article II of the Constitution of the Republic of Texas and initially comprised the Office of the Adjutant General, Texas militia, Texas Army, Texas Navy, and Texas Rangers. In the years between the Texas Revolution and Mexican War as a sovereign republic, the department remained active in land, sea, and guerilla combat operations and expeditions. Most notably, the Battle of Salado Creek, Naval Battle of Campeche, Texas-Indian Wars, and Texan Santa Fe Expedition.

When Texas joined the United States, the Texas Army and Navy were integrated into the United States Armed Forces. The War Department was re-designated the Department of Texas and consisted of the Office of the Adjutant General, Texas militia, and Texas Rangers. The department was abolished from February 4, 1856 - April 6, 1860 due a fire on October 10, 1855 that destroyed nearly all records.

During the Civil War, most of the department's service members fought under command of the Confederate States War Department (Texas Confederate Units). Some service members fought under command of the United States War Department (Texas Union Units). However, the Department of Texas maintained provincial "Home Guard" forces for defense of the state. They are credited with leaving Texas the only Confederate state unconquered by the Union Army following three failed efforts, including the Second Battle of Sabine Pass, which is also among the most notable victories of the Civil War. They are also credited with the final battle and victory of the Civil War at the Battle of Palmito Ranch.

The department was again abolished from January 1, 1867 to June 24, 1870 during the military occupation and reconstruction of Texas. After Texas was readmitted to the United States on March 30, 1870, the department was reestablished and empowered by the Constitution of Texas to fight unrest and restore order. It comprised the Office of the Adjutant General, Texas militia, and Texas State Police (Texas Rangers). Following the Militia Act of 1903, the Texas militia became the Texas National Guard. During World War I, the Department of Texas was re-designated the Adjutant General Department and again maintained provincial "Home Guard" forces for defense of the state while the Texas National Guard was under federal command. By 1935, the Texas Rangers had evolved from a paramilitary force to a police force and were reorganized under the Texas Department of Public Safety. During World War II, the United States Congress amended the National Defense Act of 1916 permanently authorizing the "Home Guard" defense forces as the Texas State Guard. The Adjutant General Department was colloquially referred to as the "Texas Military" from 2006 to 2015. On October 28, 2015 the Adjutant General Department was officially rebranded as the Texas Military Department.

The Texas Military Department has not waged a combat operation since the 19th century, however its units have participated in the Mexican War, Spanish War, Philippine War, Mexican Expedition, World War I, World War II, Cold War, and War on Terror under command of the United States Department of Defense.

Throughout the 20th and 21st centuries, the Texas Military Department has been primarily engaged in military operations other than war, including manmade and natural disaster operations, search and rescue operations, counterdrug operations, and border security operations. Most notably, the Mexican Drug War, Texas City Disaster, Hurricane Harvey, Hurricane Katrina, Hurricane Rita, Bastrop County Complex Fire, Operation Jump Start, Operation Phalanx, Operation Faithful Patriot, Operation Strong Safety, Operation Border Star, Operation Drawbridge, and Operation River Watch.

Authority 

The Texas Military Department exists under civilian control. It is empowered by Article 4, Section 7 of the Texas Constitution to "execute the laws of the State, to suppress insurrections, and to repel invasions" and Texas Government Code Title 4, Subtitle C, Chapters 431, 433, and 437. It is governed by the Texas Code of Military Justice and commanded by the Commander-in-Chief of Texas and Adjutant General of Texas.

Administration 

The Texas Military Department is required by law to maintain duplicate federal and state offices for many administrative functions such as human resources, finance, and payroll. TMD divides these traditional agency functions between federal administrative offices under the adjutant general's chief of staff and a state executive director.

Office of the Adjutant General 
The Adjutant General (TAG) of Texas is the commander and chief executive officer of the Texas Military Department. The adjutant general's position of authority over Texas Military Forces is second only to the commander-in-chief, the Governor of Texas. This position is analogous to the United States Secretary of Defense. The Adjutant General of Texas is appointed by the Governor of Texas with the advice and consent of the Texas Senate from Texas Government Code Title 4, Subtitle C, Chapter 437.003.

The Constitution of Texas vests all military authority in the commander-in-chief, an elected position, to maintain civilian control of the military. Because it is impractical for the Governor of Texas to operate the entire government, the authority is delegated via commission to the adjutant general. The adjutant general, secretary of state, attorney general, and comptroller are generally regarded as the most important executive positions in the Government of Texas.

The current and 52nd Adjutant General of Texas is Major General Tracy R. Norris, the first woman to hold that post.

The Office of the Adjutant General (OAG) is the general and his/her deputy's (mainly) civilian staff.

OAG is the principal staff element of the Adjutant General in the exercise of policy development, planning, resource management, fiscal and program evaluation and oversight, and interface and exchange with other Texas Government departments and agencies, foreign governments, and international organizations, through formal and informal processes. OAG also performs oversight and management of Texas Military Forces.

Office of the Executive Director 
The Executive Director is the civilian officer responsible for state administration, such as state payroll, state purchasing, and state human resources. These functions impact almost all of TMD's operations as many routine purchases supporting military operations use state funds, as does payroll for state active duty missions. The executive director oversees 45 state employees carrying out these state support functions, as well as coordinates with the 505 other state employees and approximately 4,300 federal personnel working in other programs and reporting through different chains of command. Despite the implications of the title, the executive director reports to the adjutant general, who ultimately maintains responsibility for all department activities and decisions. Overall, the executive director generally functions as the voice for state administrative concerns within the department's larger military organization.

Joint staff 
The joint staff coordinates operations using the Texas Military Forces and advises on common functions such as readiness, planning, and logistics.

Domestic Operations Command 
The Domestic Operations Command, commonly referred to as DOMOPS, is a unified command of the Texas Military Department established in 2011 to improve response time, maximize equipment and personnel capabilities, place various critical domestic operations programs on a sustainable footing, and maximize use of public taxes for the Texas Military Forces. It consists of the TMD Joint Staff, Joint Task Force 136th Maneuver Enhancement Brigade (MEB), 176th Engineer Brigade, Joint Counter Drug Task Force, and Southwest Border Task Force.

Awards and decorations 

Awards and decorations of the Texas Military are the medals, ribbons, badges, tabs, trophies, plaques, certificates, memorials, and monuments that recognize service and achievement while serving in the Texas Military Forces.

Capability

Forces 

They include infantry, paratroopers, special forces, armored cavalry, field artillery, communication, cyber, intelligence, support, medical, engineering, civil affairs, and weapon of mass destruction response units totalling over 23,000 service members. It also maintains a fleet of manned and unmanned aircraft with strike and reconnaissance capabilities, a fleet of rotorcraft, and a fleet of brown-water watercraft. It maintains a statewide network of garrison, training, and monitoring installations. It maintains command and control through shelter and mobile tactical operations centers.

Education 
The Texas Military Department operates two independent and comprehensive professional military education systems divided between National Guard and State Guard forces. The latter includes basic training through officer candidate school and staff college.

Civic engagement

Media

Application 
The Texas Military Department developed and maintains an eponymous software application for smartphone operating systems iOS, Android, and Windows. The app offers a variety of tools and provides realtime press releases, news, and safety alerts.

The Dispatch 
In August 1943, the Texas State Guard Officers’ Association launched a monthly magazine called The Texas Guardsman. It was later known as The Guardsman, then The State Guardsman (a national publication), and today as The Dispatch. The Dispatch is a digital magazine published monthly on the Texas Military Department's website.

Public reports 
The Texas Military Department makes a variety of reports available to the public through the Texas Military Department's website. They include select military operation after-action reviews, annual and biennial reports and audits, legislative appropriation, sunset reports, select strategic plans, and the "Mission Ready Package Catalog", which outlines its capabilities.

TMDTV 
The Texas Military Department provides an inside look at the Texas Military Forces missions, training, and capabilities through video content published on Roku and Amazon Fire TV.

Open House 
The Texas Military Department Open House, also known as "American Heroes Weekend", is a free, annual event hosted at Camp Mabry in conjunction with the American Heroes Air Show. It enables citizens to learn about TMD's missions and capabilities and interact with Texas Military Forces service members. The event includes helicopter demonstrations, emergency and first responder displays, World War II reenactments, children's activities, and a career fair. It attracts approximately 20,000 guests each year.

Texas ChalleNGe Academy 

The Texas Challenge Academy (styled ChalleNGe) is the Texas affiliate of the Youth Challenge Program operated by the Texas National Guard.

It operates a free, -month residential and 12-month post-residential education program for at-risk 16- to 18-year-old students. The program is designed to help students who are "disengaged, at-risk of dropping out, or have already dropped out of high school and is available to qualified students without regard to race, sex, religious affiliation, or household income."

The program is set in a military environment, complete with uniforms, rank, bearing, and instructors to "help cadets develop personal accountability and earn high school credit recovery, general education development, or a high school diploma." The Texas Challenge Academy is an accredited high school through Rice Consolidated Independent School District.

The Texas Challenge Academy is a volunteer program. There is no military obligation for students, nor is it considered a juvenile detention center, court-ordered boot camp, or drug/alcohol treatment center. It has no affiliation with the Texas Juvenile Justice Department.

Texas STARBASE Austin 

The Texas STARBASE Austin is the Texas affiliate of the United States Department of Defense STARBASE program.

It provides 5th grade students with free instruction in science, technology, engineering, and math (STEM), in addition to aviation and aerospace. The curriculum consists of rigorous activities, interactive investigations, experiments, simulations, and on-site tours demonstrating use of STEM in the workplace. Classroom instruction includes Newton's laws of motion, Bernoulli's principle, navigation and mapping, flight simulation, investigations of nanotechnology and nanoengineering, atmospheric properties, rocketry, engineering design process, computer-aided design (CAD), and 3D manufacturing. Students explore STEM careers, processes for goal setting and teamwork skills, the importance of staying in school, and remaining a life-long learner. Certified educators teach the curriculum with the assistance of Texas Military Forces service members and community volunteers with technical and content expertise. All curriculum content and student activities are correlated to state and national science, technology, and math standards.

It can host up to 64 students per class. The instruction is typically delivered in five-hour blocks, once a week, for five consecutive weeks.

Young Heroes Toy Drive 
The Young Heroes Toy Drive, also known as "Young Heroes of the Guard", is an annual toy drive operated by the Texas State Guard for the Christmas and holiday season. Since 2009, it has collected and distributed nearly 250,000 toys to Texas children.

Installations 

 65 armories
 Camp Bowie
 Camp Bullis
 Camp Mabry ☆
 Camp Maxey
 Camp Stanley
 Camp Swift
 Ellington Field Joint Reserve Base
 Fort Wolters

See also 
 List of conflicts involving the Texas Military

References 

 
Military in Texas
Military Department
1836 establishments in the Republic of Texas
Government agencies established in 1836